Poecopa is a genus of moths of the family Noctuidae.

Species
 Poecopa mediopuncta Bowden, 1956

References
Natural History Museum Lepidoptera genus database
Poecopa at funet

Hadeninae